Anne Butler CEng. FIEI served as president for Engineers Ireland in 2005. She was only the second woman to hold this position. Butler was a founding director of the Environmental Protection Agency in Ireland.

Biography 

Anne Butler grew up in Kilkelly, Co. Mayo. She studied Civil Engineering in University College Galway in 1976. Butler went on to complete a MSc in Structural Engineering in 1977 and then a Diploma in Environmental Engineering in 1990 from Trinity College, Dublin. Butler has become a chartered Engineer. She went on to be President of the Institution of Engineers of Ireland. Butler was a founding Director of the Environmental Protection Agency (EPA) in Ireland and remained on its board for ten years. Butler was awarded the TBD Alumni Award for her contribution to the field of "Engineering, IT and Mathematics". Butler is also a member of the Irish Academy of Engineering.

See also 
 Engineers Ireland

References 

Living people
Year of birth missing (living people)
Alumni of the University of Galway
Alumni of Trinity College Dublin
People from County Mayo
Environmental engineers
Irish women engineers
21st-century women engineers
21st-century Irish engineers
20th-century women engineers
20th-century Irish engineers